The Medic Droid was an American synthpop band from Phoenix, Arizona.

History

Beginnings and Whats Your Medium (2003–2008) 
The Medic Droid was started in 2005 with Chris Donathon, Hector Bagnod and Johnny Chavez (Droid). Bagnod and Donathon first met in 2003, but Donathon moved away from the city after they met, only to return (and begin the band) a few years later. The group gained a strong initial following through the social networking site Myspace; by mid-2008 the song "Fer Sure" had logged almost 2 million plays on the site and the group had accumulated over 100,000 friends there. Soon they were noticed by manager Avery Andon who brought the band to New York where they played their first live show opening for Enter Shikari at The Bowery Ballroom and caught the eye of A&R's from Epic Records who would later go on to sign the band. The group eventually made two new songs "Keeping Up with the Joneses" and "FSCENE8", enlisting the help of Australian DJ S3RL to remix these songs. In late 2007, Johnny Droid left the band due to issues with the other members and created his own solo band called J0hnny. In 2011, he announced he was making a band with S3RL called R0bots. 

They later hired Greg Rudawski as drummer for live shows and were signed to Modern Art Records, a local Phoenix indie label distributed by Epic Records. They wrote and recorded their debut album Whats Your Medium and it was released June 10, 2008. Whats Your Medium reached no. 33 on the Billboard Heatseekers chart.

The band was heavily inspired by 1980s popular culture, their name referencing a character from the Star Wars sequel The Empire Strikes Back, and recording a version of the Madonna anthem "Into the Groove".

Touring and break-up (2008) 
The Medic Droid went on a "Spring Tour" with A Cursive Memory in Spring 2008 across the U.S.. A Cursive Memory was the only band to go to every show with them. They co-headlined for every date. Breathe Carolina, The White Tie Affair, and The Morning Of joined the tour for select dates, but did not go for the whole tour.
Kill Hannah's Hope for the Hopeless U.S. Tour 2008 was presented by Hot Topic. Kill Hannah was the headliner and had the tour for their recently released album of b-sides and rarities. The Medic Droid, Innerpartysystem, and The White Tie Affair joined them as special guests for the whole tour. The tour began in July, 2008 and ended August, 2008.

The Blackout's headlining tour, "Sleep All Day, Party All Night", toured in Japan, Europe, and the UK. The Medic Droid was on the road for the UK dates in October. From First to Last and We Are the Ocean also toured with them.

The Medic Droid headlined their final tour with supporting acts Hyper Crush and Chronic Future in November and December 2008. It wasn't planned as their final tour, but the group's members showed strain from constant touring, and on December 16, 2008, both Bagnod and Donathon posted notice on their MySpace pages that the band had dissolved.

Reunion (2012–13) 
On February 8, 2012, Chris Donathon created a Facebook page for the band. Then the next day, on February 9, he posted, "Hey every one thanks for all the likes. I'm currently working on putting together my new live set as well as some new tracks. I'm super excited to get back out on the road again and playing some shows but i need all your guys and girls help to spread the word." On February 19 2012, AbsolutePunk posted a blog stating that the band had reunited.

On July 25, 2012 Donathon announced he would be selling limited edition T-shirts to help fund a new EP. On November 10, 2012 the band announced that they would be returning to the stage at the "South by So What?!" festival on March 16, 2013.

Second reunion (2015–2016)
On December 22, 2015, The Medic Droid added a new picture to their Facebook along with, "THE MEDIC DROID 2016." The following day they announced their first show back opening for Austin Jones on the Phoenix, Arizona date of his "We'll Fall Together Tour" on January 21, 2016 at Joe's Grotto. On March 2, 2016, The Medic Droid announced an Australian tour which began in Perth on May 15 and wrapped up on June 4, 2016 in Melbourne. Additional dates were announced on March 31, 2016. On May 19, 2016, The Medic Droid released their first song in 8 years titled "Closer". A second song, "Disco Queen", was released on June 1, 2016.
 

As of January 2017, The Medic Droid are considered to be on hiatus or disbanded.

Discography

Studio albums 

Whats Your Medium is the debut album by The Medic Droid, it was released in the United States on June 10, 2008, by Modern Art Records.

Track listing

Extended plays 
 Irrelevant (2008)

Music videos

Band members 

Current members
 Chris Donathon – lead vocals (2005–2008, 2012–2013, 2015–2016)
 Hector Bagnod (aka Hekti, Hekti 3000) – programming, synths, guitars (2005–2008, 2012–2013, 2015–2016)

Former members
 Johnny Chavez (aka Johnny Droid) – programming, synths, vocals, guitars 

Former Touring members
 Greg Rudawski - drums

References

External links
 
 

2005 establishments in Arizona
American synth-pop groups
Musical groups established in 2005
Musical groups from Phoenix, Arizona